Richard Sam Quarm is a Ghanaian politician and was the Member of Parliament for the Gomoa East constituency in the Central Region of Ghana, in the 4th parliament of the 4th republic of Ghana.

Early life and education 
Quarm was born on 28 July 1964. He attended the University of Ghana, where he obtained a Master of Business degree. He majored in accounting.

Career 
Quarm is an accountant by profession. He is also a politician.

Politics 
Quarm entered politics after being elected as the member of parliament for the Gomoa East Constituency in the Central region of Ghana in the 2004 Ghanaian general elections. He is a member of the New Patriotic Party. Quarm served for only a term as the member of parliament for the Gomoa East constituency. He thus represented the constituency in the 4th parliament of the 4th republic of Ghana from 7 January 2005 to 6 January 2009. He was oust in the subsequent elections, the 2008 Ghanaian general elections, by Ekow Panyin Okyere Eduamoah of the major opposition party, the National Democratic Congress.

2004 Elections 
Quarm was elected as the member of parliament in the 2004 Ghanaian general elections with 19,634votes out of 37,801 total valid votes cast. THis was equivalent to 51.9% of the total valid votes cast. He was elected over Justice Ekow Asafua-Ocran of the People's National Convention, Theophilus Kofi Ampah of the National Democratic Congress, Grace Ignophia Appia of the Convention People's Party, Evans Kofi Otoo of the Democratic People's Party; and Kofi Otu and Michael Leonard Kojo Amoah—two independent candidates. These obtained 0.6%, 38.2%, 2.9%, 0.7%, 5.1% and 0.5% respectively of the total valid votes cast. Quarm was elected on the ticket of the New Patriotic Party. His constituency was a part of the 16 constituencies won by the New Patriotic Party in the Central region in that elections. In all, the New Patriotic Party won a majority total 128 parliamentary seats in the 4th parliament of the 4th republic of Ghana.

Personal life 
Quarm is a Christian.

References

See also
List of MPs elected in the 2004 Ghanaian parliamentary election

1964 births
Living people
Ghanaian MPs 2005–2009
New Patriotic Party politicians
University of Ghana alumni